Matthew Sweet (born 2 December 1969) is an English journalist, broadcaster, author, and cultural historian. A graduate of the University of Oxford, he has been interviewed on many documentaries about television for the BBC and Channel 4.

Early life

Born in Hull, Sweet received a doctorate from Oxford on Wilkie Collins.

Career

Sweet was among the contributors to The Oxford Companion to English Literature and was both film and television critic for The Independent on Sunday.

Sweet's book, Shepperton Babylon: The Lost Worlds of British Cinema (2005) is a history of the British film business from the silent days, and includes interviews with surviving figures from the period. A television documentary series was adapted from the book.

Sweet has written other television films and series, including Silent Britain, Checking into History, British Film Forever, The Rules of Film Noir, Truly, Madly, Cheaply!: British B Movies, and A Brief History of Fun. He presented a BBC Radio 4 programme The Philosopher's Arms, a show recorded in front of a live audience in which classic philosophical concerns were explored. He is the host of the BBC Radio 3 programme Sound of Cinema, which is concerned with film scores and their composers, and a regular presenter of Night Waves (now titled Free Thinking) on the same network.

Sweet is a fan of the science fiction television series Doctor Who and has written several Doctor Who audio plays and short stories. He has also presented several documentaries about the series for the DVD range, including Chain Reaction (about The Caves of Androzani) and Nice or Nasty?: The Making of Vengeance on Varos. He also presented the 50th-anniversary retrospective of the series for The Culture Show called Me, You and Doctor Who in 2013. Piers Morgan interviewed him on Good Morning Britain in 2017 about the casting of the first woman to play The Doctor.

Bibliography
 Operation Chaos: The Vietnam Deserters Who Fought the CIA, the Brainwashers, and Each Other, (2018) Pan Macmillan,
 Inventing the Victorians (2001), debunking the stereotypes and myths about the Victorian Era, Faber and Faber , St. Martin's Press  (hardcover, 1st US edition)
 Shepperton Babylon: The Lost Worlds of British Cinema (2005) Faber and Faber 
 The West End Front (2011), Faber and Faber, a history of London’s grand hotels during the Second World War

Audio dramas
 Doctor Who: Year of the Pig
 Doctor Who: The Magic Mousetrap
 Bernice Summerfield: The Diet of Worms
 Jago and Litefoot: The Man at the End of the Garden
 Jago and Litefoot: The Lonely Clock
 The Voyages of Jago & Litefoot: Voyage to the New World
 Jago and Litefoot: Return of the Repressed
 Jago and Litefoot: Maurice

Short stories
 "The Lampblack Wars" - Short Trips: The History of Christmas
 "The Earwig Archipelago" - Short Trips: Time Signature

References

External links
 
 

1969 births
Living people
Alumni of the University of Oxford
BBC Radio 3 presenters
English film critics
English male journalists
English writers
Writers from Kingston upon Hull
Writers from Manchester